The 1st Wheelchair Rugby World Championships (ISMWSF) were held in Nottwil, Switzerland.

External links
 Results, via the Canadian Wheelchair Sports Association

IWRF World Championship